Domaine Chandon is a winery located in Napa Valley in the town of Yountville, California, United States. Established in 1973 by Moët et Chandon, businessman, John Wright, was the first French-owned sparkling wine producer in Napa Valley.

The Restaurant at Domaine Chandon opened at the same time as the winery and has been credited with establishing high-quality dining in the area. Udo Nechutnys was the restaurant's first chef and was succeeded by Philippe Jeanty, who later opened Bistro Jeanty in Yountville. The restaurant was renamed Etoile in 2006 and closed in December 2014 in order to make room to expand the winery's tasting room.

The winery has vineyards located in several Napa Valley appellations including Los Carneros AVA, Mt. Veeder AVA, and Yountville AVA. Domaine Chandon makes both sparkling and still wines made from Chardonnay, Pinot noir, and Pinot Meunier, the traditional grapes used in the production of Champagne.

The company also has sister wineries located in Mendoza, Argentina, the Yarra Valley in Victoria, Australia, Brazil, and Ningxia, China.

Gallery

References

External links
Domaine Chandon California official site

Wineries in Napa Valley
Yountville, California
Sparkling wines
Companies based in Napa County, California
American companies established in 1973
Food and drink companies established in 1973
1973 establishments in California
Restaurants in the San Francisco Bay Area
Tourist attractions in Napa County, California
LVMH brands